The International Socialist Organization was a Trotskyist group in the United States.

International Socialist Organization also may refer to:
International Socialist Organisation (Australia)
International Socialist Organization (Botswana)
International Socialist Organisation (Germany)
International Socialist Organisation (Ghana)
International Socialist Organisation (New Zealand)
International Socialist Organization (Zimbabwe)